Poni is one of the 45 provinces of Burkina Faso, located in its Sud-Ouest Region.

Its capital is Gaoua.

Departments
Poni is divided into 10 departments:
 Bouroum-Bouroum
 Bousséra
 Djigoué
 Gaoua
 Gbomblora
 Kampti
 Loropéni
 Malba
 Nako
 Périgban (or Pérignan)

Places of interest

Poni Province is home to Burkina Faso's first UNESCO World Heritage site, the Ruins of Loropéni, which was added to the UNESCO World Heritage List in 2009.

See also
Regions of Burkina Faso
Provinces of Burkina Faso
Departments of Burkina Faso

References

 
Provinces of Burkina Faso